Galimy is an urban locality (an urban-type settlement) in Omsukchansky District of Magadan Oblast, Russia. Population:

References

Urban-type settlements in Magadan Oblast